Fabrican is an instant spray-on fabric technology. The spray-on material is made from polymers and natural or synthetic fibres. The spray is delivered from a compressed air spray gun or aerosol can and dries upon contact with the air, creating a non-woven fabric that can be applied to many surfaces (including water). The material is sterile when it is dispensed from the spray gun or aerosol can.

History 
It was invented by Dr. Manel Torres while investigating ways to speed up conventional methods of constructing garments as part of his PhD research in Fashion at the Royal College of Art and Imperial College London. Dr. Torres founded Fabrican Ltd in 2003. The technology was further developed by Fabrican Ltd while based at Imperial College London.

Fabrican has been showcased at London Fashion Week 2010 as well as fashion shows in Milan and Moscow and at TED Talks. The technology has been featured in the media by the BBC, the Discovery Channel, CBS News

In 2014, in conformity with an organisational emphasis on developing biomedical applications, Fabrican occupied new laboratory facilities at the London Bioscience Innovation Centre.

At Paris Fashion Week 2022, Bella Hadid closed the Coperni fashion show after being sprayed into a dress on stage and walking the runway.

See also
Spray-on condom
Silly String
Spray-on skin

References

External links
Video from The Daily Telegraph
Website

Technical fabrics